Janet Marlow (born 9 December 1958) is a British middle-distance runner. She competed in the women's 1500 metres at the 1980 Summer Olympics.

References

1958 births
Living people
Athletes (track and field) at the 1980 Summer Olympics
British female middle-distance runners
Olympic athletes of Great Britain
Place of birth missing (living people)